Belmont Avenue Bridge in Philadelphia is a historic stone arch bridge located in Fairmount Park, Philadelphia, Pennsylvania.  It was built in 1896, and is a single-span bridge.  The arch measures .

It was added to the National Register of Historic Places in 1988.

References

Bridges on the National Register of Historic Places in Philadelphia
Bridges completed in 1896
West Fairmount Park
Road bridges on the National Register of Historic Places in Pennsylvania
Stone arch bridges in the United States
1896 establishments in Pennsylvania